David Lillieström Karlsson (born April 12, 1993) is a Swedish former professional ice hockey player, who last played with Guildford Flames of the UK's Elite Ice Hockey League (EIHL).

In the 2009-10 he started to play with the AIK J18 team in the J18 Elit. After a spell with Östersunds IK of the Swedish Elitserien, Lillieström Karlsson moved to the UK to sign for Guildford Flames in June 2017.

After suffering a concussion while playing for Guildford, Lillieström Karlsson was forced to retire at the age of 24. The announcement was made on 24 October 2017.

References

External links

1993 births
Living people
AIK IF players
Guildford Flames players
Swedish ice hockey forwards
Ice hockey people from Stockholm